Liverpool is a city and port in Merseyside, England, which contains many listed buildings.  A listed building is a structure designated by the Secretary of State for Digital, Culture, Media and Sport (advised by Historic England) of being of architectural and/or of historical importance and, as such, is included in the National Heritage List for England.  There are three grades of listing, according to the degree of importance of the structure.  Grade I includes those buildings that are of "exceptional interest, sometimes considered to be internationally important"; the buildings in Grade II* are "particularly important buildings of more than special interest"; and those in Grade II are "nationally important and of special interest".  Very few buildings are included in Grade I — only 2.5% of the total.  Grade II* buildings represent 5.5% of the total, while the great majority, 92%, are included in Grade II.

Liverpool contains more than 1,550 listed buildings, of which 28 are in Grade I, 109 in Grade II*, and the rest in Grade II.  This list contains the Grade II listed buildings in the L6 postal district of Liverpool.  The postal district contains the suburb of Fairfield, and part of Everton, once a separate village, later absorbed by the expansion of Liverpool to become another suburb.  The district is mainly residential, and most of the listed buildings are houses, or associated structures.  Also listed are a hospital and its associated buildings, a waterworks, a former chapel, a bandstand, a war memorial, a drinking fountain, and a pillar box.

Grade II listed buildings from other areas in the city can be found through the box on the right, along with the lists of the Grade I and Grade II* buildings in the city.

Buildings
{|style="width:100%;border:0px;text-align:left;line-height:150%;"
|-valign="top"
|

See also

 Architecture of Liverpool

References
Notes

Citations

Sources

External links
 Liverpool City Council listed buildings information page

Buildings in Liverpool 06
Listed buildings in Liverpool 06
Liverpool-related lists